G. M. C. Balayogi Indoor Stadium is an indoor arena located in Hyderabad, India. It holds 5,000 people. It is located in the Gachibowli suburb. The stadium was built in 2002 headed by N. Chandrababu Naidu Government to host the 2003 Afro -Asian games. The indoor stadium is located beside the Hyderabad International Institute of Information Technology. The venue hosted the 2009 BWF World Championships. It is one of the home arenas for the India's prime basketball league, the UBA Pro Basketball League. In 2017, 3rd edition of TEDxHyderabad was conducted in Gachibowli Indoor Stadium.

Central arena
The central playing arena measures 60 metres by 40 metres in size and consists of a basketball court and six badminton courts. The indoor stadium can also host other sporting events such as kabaddi, taekwondo, table tennis, boxing, judo, wrestling and weight lifting.

Pedestrian bridge
The design of the indoor stadium involves segregation of spectators' access from the access of sports-persons and officials. Four large pedestrian bridges placed at the four cardinal points allow access to the spectators directly to the stands at the up-per level.
A combination of ramps and staircases lead the spectator to a height of 3m from ground level, from where a 4m wide steel-truss bridge of 12m span leads the spectators to a circumferential corridor from where they enter into the stands.

See also
 G. M. C. Balayogi Athletic Stadium
 List of stadiums in Hyderabad, India
 2002 National Games of India
 2003 Afro-Asian Games

References

Indoor arenas in India
Badminton venues
Sport in Hyderabad, India
Badminton in India
Sports venues in Hyderabad, India
Wrestling in India
Basketball venues in India
Boxing venues in India
Sports venues in Telangana
Sports venues completed in 2002
2002 establishments in Andhra Pradesh
Kabaddi venues in India